Unio ravoisieri is a species of bivalve belonging to the family Unionidae.

The species is found in Western Mediterranean.

References

Unionidae